Sepedonophilus is a genus of three species of centipedes in the family Geophilidae. It is endemic to Australia, and was first described by Austrian myriapodologist Carl Attems in 1909. Centipedes in this genus range from 2 cm to 5 cm in length and have 49 to 79 pairs of legs.

Species
Valid species:
 Sepedonophilus attemsii (Verhoeff, 1925)
 Sepedonophilus hodites Chamberlin, 1940
 Sepedonophilus perforatus (Haase, 1887)

References

 

 
 
Centipede genera
Taxa named by Carl Attems
Animals described in 1909
Centipedes of Australia
Endemic fauna of Australia